RCB Bank (formerly Russian Commercial Bank) is an international bank founded in 1995 and headquartered in Limassol, Cyprus.

Background

In 1963, the London branch of the Russian Moscow Narodny Bank established a branch in Beirut for foreign trade and export support from the USSR to Middle Eastern countries. In 1985, during the height of the Libyan–U.S. crisis, the Beirut branch closed and some staff members and documents were transferred to Cyprus, where it received its papers from the State Bank of the USSR in 1989. It was later transferred to the Russian VTB Bank, becoming a full subsidiary of VTB in August 1995. In 2002, VTB owned the controlling stake in RCB Bank and also had controlling stakes in the Vienna-based Donau Bank and the Luxembourg-based East-West United Bank. By 2005, VTB controlled 100% of RCB Bank.

History
RCB Bank was founded in 1995 under the name Russian Commercial Bank (Cyprus), which changed to simply RCB Bank in November 2013. The bank is based in Limassol, with branches in Nicosia and nine other locations across Cyprus as of July 2018. It also has branches in Luxembourg and representative offices in Moscow and London.

In November 2014, RCB Bank was categorized as a significant European Union bank under direct supervision of the European Central Bank through the Single Supervisory Mechanism. Since 2016, RCB Bank has been a partner of the European Investment Bank and the European Investment Fund in financing investment projects implemented with the EU funds in Cyprus.

In August 2017, Zimarin increased his ownership of RCB to 49.9% by acquiring a 19.85% stake in the Russian Otkritie Financial Corporation Bank.

In February 2022, VTB Bank sold its shares in RCB to Cypriot shareholders in the midst of economic effects caused by Russia's invasion of Ukraine, thus making the bank entirely Cypriot-owned for the first time. 

In line with the voluntary decision of the shareholders of RCB to wind down banking operations, the ECB/CBC approved the withdrawal of the banking license of RCB on 22 December 2022.

See also
 Tomas Alibegov

References

External links

Banks under direct supervision of the European Central Bank
1995 establishments in Cyprus
Companies based in Limassol
Banks established in 1995
Banks of Cyprus